Funny Games may refer to:

 Funny Games (1997 film), an Austrian horror film
 Funny Games (2007 film), a shot-for-shot remake of the 1997 film by the same director

See also
 Fun and Games (disambiguation)